A. sinensis  may refer to:
 Angelica sinensis, the "dong quai" or female ginseng, a herb species indigenous to China
 Aquilaria sinensis, a plant species endemic to China
 Alligator sinensis, an alligator species endemic to China

See also
 Flora Sinensis